In mathematics, the eccentricity of a conic section is a non-negative real number that uniquely characterizes its shape.

More formally two conic sections are similar if and only if they have the same eccentricity.

One can think of the eccentricity as a measure of how much a conic section deviates from being circular. In particular:
 The eccentricity of a circle is zero.
 The eccentricity of an ellipse which is not a circle is greater than zero but less than 1.
 The eccentricity of a parabola is 1.
 The eccentricity of a hyperbola is greater than 1.
 The eccentricity of a pair of lines is

Definitions

Any conic section can be defined as the locus of points whose distances to a point (the focus) and a line (the directrix) are in a constant ratio.

The eccentricity can also be defined in terms of the intersection of a plane and a double-napped cone associated with the conic section. If the cone is oriented with its axis  vertical, the eccentricity is

where β  is the angle between the plane and the horizontal and  α is the angle between the cone's slant generator and the horizontal. For  the plane section is a circle, for  a parabola. (The plane must not meet the vertex of the cone.)

The linear eccentricity of an ellipse or hyperbola, denoted  (or sometimes  or ), is the distance between its center and either of its two foci. The eccentricity can be defined as the ratio of the linear eccentricity to the semimajor axis : that is,  (lacking a center, the linear eccentricity for parabolas is not defined). It is worth to note that a parabola can be treated as an ellipse or a hyperbola, but with one focal point at infinity.

Alternative names
The eccentricity is sometimes called the first eccentricity to distinguish it from the second eccentricity and third eccentricity defined for ellipses (see below). The eccentricity is also sometimes called the numerical eccentricity.

In the case of ellipses and hyperbolas the linear eccentricity is sometimes called the half-focal separation.

Notation
Three notational conventions are in common use:
This article uses the first notation.

Values

When the conic section is given in the general quadratic form

the following formula gives the eccentricity  if the conic section is not a parabola (which has eccentricity equal to 1), not a degenerate hyperbola or degenerate ellipse, and not an imaginary ellipse:

where  if the determinant of the 3×3 matrix

is negative or  if that determinant is positive.

Ellipses

The eccentricity of an ellipse is strictly less than 1. When circles (which have eccentricity 0) are counted as ellipses, the eccentricity of an ellipse is greater than or equal to 0; if circles are given a special category and are excluded from the category of ellipses, then the eccentricity of an ellipse is strictly greater than 0.

For any ellipse, let  be the length of its semi-major axis and  be the length of its semi-minor axis.

We define a number of related additional concepts (only for ellipses):

Other formulae for the eccentricity of an ellipse

The eccentricity of an ellipse is, most simply, the ratio of the distance  between the center of the ellipse and each focus to the length of the semimajor axis .

The eccentricity is also the ratio of the semimajor axis  to the distance  from the center to the directrix:

Then with semimajor axis , the eccentricity is given by

which is the distance between the foci divided by the length of the major axis.

Hyperbolas

The eccentricity of a hyperbola can be any real number greater than 1, with no upper bound.

Quadrics

The eccentricity of a three-dimensional quadric is the eccentricity of a designated section of it. For example, on a triaxial ellipsoid, the meridional eccentricity is that of the ellipse formed by a section containing both the longest and the shortest axes (one of which will be the polar axis), and the equatorial eccentricity is the eccentricity of the ellipse formed by a section through the centre, perpendicular to the polar axis (i.e. in the equatorial plane). But: conic sections may occur on surfaces of higher order, too (see image).

Celestial mechanics

In celestial mechanics, for bound orbits in a spherical potential, the definition above is informally generalized. When the apocenter distance is close to the pericenter distance, the orbit is said to have low eccentricity; when they are very different, the orbit is said be eccentric or having eccentricity near unity. This definition coincides with the mathematical definition of eccentricity for ellipses, in Keplerian, i.e.,  potentials.

Analogous classifications 

A number of classifications in mathematics use derived terminology from the classification of conic sections by eccentricity:
Classification of elements of SL2(R) as elliptic, parabolic, and hyperbolic – and similarly for classification of elements of PSL2(R), the real Möbius transformations.
Classification of discrete distributions by variance-to-mean ratio; see cumulants of some discrete probability distributions for details.
Classification of partial differential equations is by analogy with the conic sections classification; see elliptic, parabolic and hyperbolic partial differential equations.

See also
Kepler orbits
Eccentricity vector
Orbital eccentricity
Roundness (object)
Conic constant

References

External links

MathWorld: Eccentricity

Conic sections
Analytic geometry